Farra School or Farragh College was established in 1758 as a charter school and located near Bunbrosna, Co. Westmeath. 

The school was set up to provide Agricultural instruction to mainly Roman Catholic young boys and men. The school was built circa 1743 on the land of the Wilson family and financed by Rev. William Wilson's will. 

William Wilson's uncle Andrew Wilson's will established the Wilson's Hospital School at Heathlands for Church of Ireland boys, 1726.

The first recorded rugby game in Ireland was played at Farra school in Westmeath on 25 Feb 1879.

Farra School were runners up in the 1887 Rugby Leinster Schools Senior Cup.

The writer and poet Shan Bullock (John William Bullock) attended Farra School.

References

Secondary schools in County Westmeath